Adwar Mousa (born 10 April 1950), also known as Edwar Mousa and Edward Mousa, is an Assyrian singer-songwriter and poet who mainly writes folk dance music. Mousa is famed for writing a dozen notable songs in the late 1980s and early 1990s for prolific and popular Assyrian singers such as Sargon Gabriel, Ashur Bet Sargis, Janan Sawa, Linda George and Juliana Jendo, among others. Mousa is originally from Syria, before he immigrated to Sweden and later resettled in Chicago with his family in the 2010s.

Writing credits
Ashur Bet Sargis
 Loosh Ane Jooleh Sodaneh (1990)

Janan Sawa
 Min Poomakh, Min Poomy (1988)
 Shooshan (1988)

Juliana Jendo
 Derdee (1990)
 Khlola (1990)
 Sogul (1990)
 Tlibee (1990)

Linda George
 Aynet Nooneh (1992)

Sargon Gabriel
 Wy Wy Minnakh (1987)
 Siqly Al Resha d'Toora (1992)	
 Maney E Dzemra (1992)	
 Bessa Sapar (1992)
 Nareeneh (1992)	
 Rikidla Mya Meeney (1992)
 Matenee (1994)
 Yasmin (1994)

Shabeh Lawando
 Emin Dayer Azizi (1986)
 Slalee Al Karmanee (1990)
 Dashta (1990)
 Komta O Khwara (1990)
 Mbarkhula (1990)
 Sogul (1990)
 Saimon Moghdalee (1990)
 Sayda (1991)
 Sheshen Gulpani (1991)
 Mkhee Pokha (1991)
 Moomee (1992)
 Matwate d-Ninweh (1992)
 Hoy Jano (1993)
 Dilan (1993)
 Kma Bayinakh (1993)
 Tre Warden (1993)
 Sayraneh (1995)
 Saparchiwin (1995)
 Lo Athra (1995)

Discography
 Rwily (1998)
 En Tali (1999)
 Edward Mousa Live (2002)

Legacy

Adwar Mousa's dance songs "Narineh" and "Wye Wye Minakh", which were written for Sargon Gabriel, still remain widely covered and played in today's Assyrian weddings and jubilant parties. They are in the rhythm of bagiyeh and sheikhani, respectively, thus making them popular choices for dancing. His other folk dance songs, such as "Hoy Jano", "Hatkha O Atkha", "Kewat Ya Shimshi" and "Barowen", are also immensely covered in Assyrian parties, which have gained popularity since the early 2010s, despite the fact that they were composed in the early 1990s. At over 1.6 million hits, "Kha Yoma Kheshli Khlola", written by Mousa and sung by Bassam Slivo, is one of the most-viewed Assyrian songs on YouTube. His daughter, Nagham Adwar Mousa, is also a singer.

References

External links
 Facebook

1950 births
Living people
Assyrian musicians
Syrian poets
Syriac-language singers
Syrian emigrants to the United States
20th-century Syrian male singers
Singers from Chicago